Sea Tiger is a 1952 American action film directed by Frank McDonald and starring Marguerite Chapman, John Archer and Harry Lauter. It is based on Charles Yerkow's short story "Island Freighter". The film sets were designed by the art directors Dave Milton and Vin Taylor. It was distributed by Monogram Pictures.

Plot

Cast
 Marguerite Chapman as Jenine Duval  
 John Archer as Ben McGrun  
 Harry Lauter as Randall, alias Jon Edmun  
 Marvin Press as Quick-Boy  
 Mara Corday as Lola, Hotel Proprietress  
 Ralph Sanford as Fat Harry, Innkeeper 
 Lyle Talbot as Mr. Williams, Insurance Man  
 Paul McGuire as Bendy  
 Sam Flint as Jim Klavier  
 John Mylong as J.M. Hennick 
 Wayne Mallory as Seaman  
 John Reese as Seaman

References

Bibliography
 Langman, Larry. Return to Paradise: A Guide to South Sea Island Films. Scarecrow Press, 1998.

External links
 

1952 films
1950s action films
1950s English-language films
American action films
Films directed by Frank McDonald
Seafaring films
Films based on short fiction
American black-and-white films
1950s American films
Monogram Pictures films